The Select Committee On Lynas Advanced Materials Plant (LAMP) was a select committee of the Malaysian House of Representatives, which studied issues raised by the public regarding safety standards of the Lynas Advanced Materials Plant (LAMP) in Kuantan, Pahang. The committee sat for a three-month period between 20 March and 20 June 2012.

Report
Following the end of the select committee's three-month timeframe, reports have been made available on the Parliament of Malaysia website: .

Membership

12th Parliament
As of December 2018, the Committee's current members are as follows:

Chair of the Select Committee On Lynas Advanced Materials Plant (LAMP)

See also
Parliamentary Committees of Malaysia

References

External links
SPECIAL SELECT COMMITTEE ON LYNAS ADVANCED MATERIALS PLANT (LAMP)

Parliament of Malaysia
Committees of the Parliament of Malaysia
Committees of the Dewan Rakyat